Miss World 1968, the 18th edition of the Miss World pageant, was held at the Lyceum Ballroom in London, UK on 14 November 1968. 53 contestants competed for the crown. Madeline Hartog-Bel of Peru crowned her successor Penelope Plummer of Australia.
This is the first time that Australia to win Miss World.

Results

Contestants

  – Viviana Roldán
  – Penelope Plummer
  – Brigitte Krüger
  – Rose Helena Dauchot
  – Sonja Doumen
  – Angela Carmelia Stecca
  – Nancy Wilson
  – Nilanthie Wijesinghe
  – Carmen Smith
  – Beatriz Sierra González
  – Patricia Diers
  – Diana Dimitropoulou
  – Yet Schaufuss
  – Ingrid García
  – Marcia Virginia Ramos Christiansen
  – Leena Sipilä
  – Nelly Gallerne
  – Margot Schmalzriedt
  – Lovell Rosebud Wordie
  – Sandra Sanguinetti
 - Lia Malta
  – Adrienne Harris
  – Alida Grootenboer
  – Jane Coelho
  – June MacMahon
  – Miri Zamir
  – Maria Pia Gianporcaro
  – Karlene Waddell
  – Ryoko Miyoshi
  – Josephine Moikobu
  – Lee Ji-eun
  – Wilhelmina Nadieh Brownell
  – Irene Siedler
  – Ursulina Grech
  – Ana María Magaña
  – Zakia Chamouch
  – Christine Mary Antunovic
  – Margine Davidson Morales
  – Foluke Ogundipe
  – Hedda Lie
  – Ana Rosa Berninzon Devéscovi
  – Arene Cecilia Amabuyok
  – Mitsianna Stander
  – Gunilla Friden
  – Jeanette Biffiger
  – Pinnarut Tananchai
  – Zohra Boufaden
  – Mine Kurkcuoglu
  – Joy Lehai
  – Kathleen Winstanley
  – Johnine Leigh Avery
  – Cherry Núñez Rodríguez
  – Ivona Puhlera

Notes

Withdraws
  – María Amparo Rodrigo Lorenza

Nations not competing
  – Helga Jonsdóttir
  – Marie-France Lablache

Disqualified
  – Lili Bissar (discovered the night before the finals to be only 15 years old)

External links
 Miss World official site
 Pageantopolis – Miss World 1968

Miss World
1968 in London
1968 beauty pageants
Beauty pageants in the United Kingdom
November 1968 events in the United Kingdom